Secrets is a 1971 British drama film directed by Philip Saville, and starring Jacqueline Bisset, Per Oscarsson, Shirley Knight and Robert Powell.

Synopsis
Over the course of a single day a couple's strained marriage is revealed and then cured by their flirtations with strangers.

Cast
 Jacqueline Bisset as Jennifer Wood
 Per Oscarsson as Raoul Kramer
 Robert Powell as Allan Wood
 Shirley Knight as Beatrice 
 Martin C. Thurley as Raymond 
 Peter Jeffries as Interviewer
 Stephen Martin as Dominic
 Tarka Kings as Judy Wood

Production
The film was made on location around London including in Hyde Park. The film's sets were designed by the art director Brian Eatwell. The film was shot in Super 16mm which the producer claim was 80% cheaper than if it had been shot on 35 mm.

As stated in a 5 May 1978 HR brief, Jacqueline Bisset was displeased by Lone Star's exploitation of her nude love scene. HR noted that Secrets was initially purchased by Lone Star to be converted into a pornographic short film, and Penthouse, Playboy and Hustler were reportedly bidding up to $60,000 to acquire still photographs from the picture. A 13 Mar 1978 Box advertisement for the R-rated film offered distributors a $10,000 challenge to disprove Bisset's contention that she did not appear in the disputed nude love scenes, using the controversy to sell the picture to exhibitors.

Release
Sight and Sound said it "would hardly pass an hour on television."

The New Statesman called it "a silliness."

The Monthly Film Bulleting said "technical experiment is the film's only novelty."

The film was released in the United States in 1978 with publicity highlighting the fact it featured a nude scene from Bisset.

The Los Angeles Times called it "among Bisset's best films."

References

External links

Secrets at BFI
Secrets at Letterbox DVD

1971 films
British drama films
Films directed by Philip Saville
1971 drama films
Films shot in London
Films set in London
1970s English-language films
1970s British films
English-language drama films